Tjan Tjoe Som (1903–1969) was an Indonesian Chinese intellectual and sinologist at the University of Indonesia.

Early life

Tjan was the son of a prominent Muslim Chinese family in Surakarta, Dutch East Indies. His first education was in the local HCS (Dutch-Chinese School) and then in the AMS (General Middle School) in Yogyakarta.

His brother Tjan Tjoe Siem also became an academic (of Javanese literature).

Academic career

In 1935 he went to the Netherlands to study Sinology at Leiden University. He obtained a PhD in Sinology in 1949 and was appointed as a professor there. In 1952 he returned to Indonesia and became head of the department of Sinology at the FSUI (Fakultas Sastra Universitas Indonesia - Literature Department at the University of Indonesia).

Political activities

In the late 1950s he became associated with left-wing politics at a high level. In 1958 he joined the Himpunan Sardjana Indonesia (Indonesian: Indonesian Scholars' Association), a mass organization affiliated with the Communist Party of Indonesia (PKI). He was appointed as director of the Universitas Rakjat (Indonesian: People's university), a PKI educational network. He was also an advisor for the Chinese language edition of Warta Bhakti, a major left-wing newspaper in Indonesia at that time.

He died in Bandung in February 1969.

Selected works

 Po-hu-t'ung = The comprehensive discussions in the White Tiger Hall: a contribution to the history of classical studies in the Han period (1949)
 De plaats van de studie der kanonieke boeken in de Chinese filosofie (1950)
 Eastern and Western World (1953)
 Tugas ilmu pengetahuan (1959)

References

1903 births
1969 deaths
Indonesian sinologists
Academic staff of the University of Indonesia
Indonesian people of Chinese descent
Leiden University alumni
Academic staff of Leiden University